Beauronne may refer to:

Beauronne, Dordogne, a commune in southwestern France
three small rivers in southwestern France, all tributaries of the river Isle:
Beauronne (Chancelade), flowing through Chancelade
Beauronne (Les Lèches), flowing through Les Lèches
Beauronne (Saint-Vincent-de-Connezac), flowing through Saint-Vincent-de-Connezac